Melissa Bell (born 7 November 1972) is an Australian actress and fashion designer. She is known for her roles of Bonnie Tait in E Street, Lucy Robinson in Neighbours, and Emily Harris in Paradise Beach. Bell also made appearances in Home & Away and Water Rats.

Career

Acting
Bell had earlier appeared in the soap opera E Street in the guest role of Janine. She left the role of Lucy in Neighbours to return to E Street to play new character, the eco-crusader Bonnie Tait. After E Street ended Bell made several brief returns to Neighbours.

She also acted in another soap, Paradise Beach, playing surfer Emily Harris. She later appeared in several lifestyle programs, such as Celebrity Overhaul.

Fashion design
Bell later become a fashion designer, selling kaftans and party wear from a boutique in Double Bay, Sydney.

Personal life
Bell was married to Jason Redlich from 1996 to 1998. They have one son. Following the end of her marriage, Bell suffered from body dysmorphic disorder and depression. In 2000, Bell married Gary Dickinson. They had three children and lived on the Gold Coast. In November 2015, Dickinson, then 57, suffered a heart attack which left him in a coma. Dickinson died on 13 February 2016. In 2020, Bell became engaged to Grant Thompson, and the couple married in 2022, with Bell wearing the dress her Neighbours character wore in her on-screen wedding.

Filmography

References

External links

1972 births
Living people
Australian television actresses
Actresses from the Gold Coast, Queensland